Yellow-necked greenbul may refer to:

 Falkenstein's greenbul, a species of bird found in western and central Africa
 Yellow-bellied greenbul, a species of bird found in eastern, southern, and west-central Africa

Birds by common name